Popularly known internationally as the Green Maharaja, the London born owner of RRB Energy, Rakesh Bakshi (4 June 1958 - 13 April 2020) was an Indian climate change activist, professor and businessman credited as one of the pioneers in the field of renewable energy sources in India and is the founder of Solchrome Private Limited and RRB Energy Limited. He last held the position of Chairman and Managing Director at RRBEL. In 1991, Rakesh Bakshi was awarded Padma Shri, India's 4th highest civilian award by the then President of India Shri. R. Venkataraman in recognition of his commendable contributions to the field of renewable energy sources. He is the first Indian to be honoured with this award for working in the field of renewable energy.

Early life
Rakesh Bakshi was born in London on 4 June 1958. At a very young age, he recognized the importance and significance of tapping available alternative energy sources in order to check global warming and climate change. He completed his graduation from National Institute of Technology Kurukshetra and holds post graduate qualifications in Computer Science and Foreign Trade. After completing his studies, he dedicated himself in realizing his passion by setting up companies to research, manufacture and implement renewable power plants. He also was a guest lecturer at IIT, Delhi for a short stint.

Career
Having been a name to reckon with in the field of alternative energy, Rakesh Bakshi is credited as the founder of the following companies that work in the field of researching and manufacturing renewable energy generation equipments, mainly in the area of wind power generation.
 Solchrome Private Limited - The First Continuous Plating Solar Selective Coating Plant established in India. 
 RRB Energy Limited
 Eco RRB Infra Private Limited
Rakesh Bakshi contributed as Eco-preneur – an entrepreneur in environment friendly technology and businesses. He ventured into the commercial application of products and services in the field of renewable energy. He was a forerunner in establishing Wind Power as a major source of power generation in India.
Rakesh Bakshi introduced to Indian energy sector some of the most advanced and best western technologies in the field of renewable energy and wind power energy from developed countries from Europe and Canada. However, it was not just about technology and know-how transfer from western world to India. Rakesh Bakshi's companies marketed and exported their renewable energy products and services to Spain, Germany, the Netherlands, Denmark, Greece, Malaysia, Mauritius, Botswana, Korea, Australia, Cyprus, U.K. and Turkey

Awards and recognitions
Padma Shri - 1991
Prince Henrik's Medal of Honour from Denmark - 1997
Climate Technology Leadership Award United Nations Framework Convention on Climate Change - 1999 
Udyog Rattan
2000 Millennium Award
SESI Business Leadership Award from Solar Energy Society of India- 2005
Lifetime Achievement Award
Rotary's "For The Sake Of Honour" Award
Order of the Star of Italian Solidarity, Knight Commander
German Cross of the Order of Merit

Titles
Wind Energy Pioneer
Green Maharaja

Personal life
Rakesh Bakshi is married to Seema Bakshi Daughter of Brigadier Dr Kapil Mohan, (Chairman and Managing Director of Mohan Meakin limited ), comes from one of the most respected and highly illustrious families of India. She died on 11 October 2017 in Chennai. He has three Children Shweathambri Bakshi (daughter), Riteesh Mohan Bakshi (son) and Raghav Mohan Bakshi (son).

References

Living people
Businesspeople from Delhi
Indian industrialists
Indian chief executives
1958 births
Businesspeople from London
Recipients of the Padma Shri in science & engineering